The 2018 UNCAF U-16 Tournament was the 8th UNCAF U-16 Tournament, a biennial international football tournament contested by men's under-16 national teams.  Organized by UNCAF, the tournament took place in Guatemala between 20 and 27 October 2018.

The matches were played at Estadio Municipal Pinula Contreras.  All seven Central American teams took part of the tournament, playing each other in a round-robin format.  Panama won their first title.

Venue

Final standings

Results

Goalscorers
TBD

External links
 UNCAF Official Website

References

2018
2018 in youth association football
2018–19 in Guatemalan football
2018